Uslu is a village in Derecik District in Hakkâri Province in Turkey. The village is populated by Kurds of the Gerdî tribe and had a population of 2,247 in 2022.

Uslu has the three hamlets of Akören, Taşlıçay and Ulaşan attached to it.

It was attached to Şemdinli District before becoming part of the newly created Derecik District in 2018.

Population 
Population history of the village from 2016 to 2022:

References 

Villages in Derecik District
Kurdish settlements in Hakkâri Province